Hinton is a town in west-central Alberta, Canada.

Geography
Hinton lies in the Alberta Plateau Benchlands physiographic subdivision of the Interior Plains. Soils around town are influenced by deposits of carbonate-rich, wind-blown sand and silt which usually have surface textures of loam, sandy loam or silt loam. They are moderately alkaline, in contrast to the varying, mostly moderate acidity which prevails beyond the zone of calcareous aeolian material.

History 

The Town of Hinton was named for William P. Hinton, Vice President and General Manager of the Grand Trunk Pacific Railway. The community was named in 1911 and remained a hamlet for the next 45 years.

Settlement in the area was scattered along a line some twelve kilometres (7.5 mi) in length. A site along Hardisty Creek is where an aboriginal group from the Jasper area had left members stricken with smallpox while the rest of the group travelled to Lac Ste. Anne to find medical aid for the smallpox epidemic which was ravaging the indigenous population in Alberta. The area was thus dubbed Cache Picote (Smallpox Camp) in 1870.

In 1888, Jack Gregg established a trading post at Prairie Creek to serve travellers along the Jasper trail. The creek is now known as Muskuta Creek after an incorrect interpretation of the Cree name by white settlers. The construction of the Grand Trunk Pacific Railway saw the establishment of a construction camp at the mouth of Prairie Creek (at the Athabasca River) in 1908. A trestle was built over the creek and is still in use by CN today.

In 1911 the Grand Trunk Pacific built a station house at mile 978 west of Winnipeg. The station was named Hinton, and the community was born.

The Canadian Northern Railway also established a station called Bliss in 1914. The Canadian Northern Railway ran north of the Grand Trunk Pacific line and the Bliss station was located about 4 miles east of Hinton in the Athabasca River valley. In 1916 when the Grand Trunk Pacific rail line was temporarily closed, Dalehurst became the postal station for Hinton. Entrance (formerly Dyke), another important centre to Hinton, served as its communications centre. The original community known as Entrance was so named due to its location at the entrance to Jasper National Park and was located on the Canadian Northern rail line north of the Athabasca River from where Entrance (formerly Dyke) is located. The original site of Entrance is now known as Old Entrance.

The Canadian National Railway became the owner of both rail lines, the Canadian Northern and the Grand Trunk pacific and various portions of both lines were used by the new parent company.  The company, however, abandoned the use of the rail line through Bliss in 1926 and once again the rail line through Hinton was opened.

The population of Hinton experienced a boom during the 1930s when American entrepreneur Frank Seabolt and two partners opened the Hinton coal mine in 1931. Shortly thereafter, a recession caused the population to dwindle to fewer than 100 people, but the town began to rebound in 1955 with the construction of a pulp mill. The mill brought rapid growth to Hinton and a new village was developed and was named the Village of Drinnan in 1956.  The two communities amalgamated on April 1, 1957, to form the present Town of Hinton.

Hinton train collision

On February 8, 1986 a collision between a Canadian National Railway freight train and a Via Rail passenger train called the Super Continental occurred, killing twenty-three people.  It was the deadliest rail disaster in Canada since the Dugald accident of 1947, which had thirty-one fatalities, and would not be surpassed until the Lac-Mégantic rail disaster in 2013 which resulted in forty-seven fatalities. It was surmised that the accident was a result of the crew of the freight train becoming incapacitated, and the resulting investigations revealed serious flaws in Canadian National Railway's employee practices.

Demographics 

In the 2016 Census of Population conducted by Statistics Canada, the Town of Hinton recorded a population of 9,882 living in 3,930 of its 4,343 total private dwellings, a  increase from its 2011 population of 9,640.

The population of the Town of Hinton according to its 2009 municipal census is 9,825.  The census originally counted 9,812 people within the town limits but an additional 13 were added when a long-standing annexation application was approved shortly after the census was conducted.

It is the site of the Foothills Ojibway Society (Non-status First Nation).

Attractions 
Hinton is one of two staging areas for expeditions in the Willmore Wilderness Park, the other being Grande Cache.

Nature lovers are drawn to Hinton to visit the Beaver Boardwalk, a 3 kilometre walk where they can see beavers and other wildlife.

Infrastructure

Transportation 

Hinton Transit is the municipal public transportation service, operated under contract by First Canada, which is responsible for providing the vehicles, drivers and maintenance. The bus service operates on Monday to Friday from 8:00am to 8:00pm and on Saturday from 8:00am to 6:00pm. No service is provided on Sunday or statutory holidays. There is also an accessible transit service available for residents with physical and cognitive disabilities called The Freedom Express Service. 

As a flag stop Via Rail's The Canadian calls at the Hinton CN railway station three times per week, in each direction.

Health care 
Emergency and other medical care is provided at the Hinton Healthcare Centre.

Education 
Post Secondary
 Yellowhead Regional Educational Consortium (YREC) - Grande Prairie Regional College 
Grande Yellowhead Regional Division No. 35
Crescent Valley Elementary School (K-7)
Harry Collinge High School (8-12 English, French)
Mountain View Elementary School (K-7 English, French)

Evergreen Catholic Separate School Division
St. Gregory Catholic Elementary School (K-4)
Father Gerard Redmond Community Catholic School (5-12)

Media 
Newspapers

One weekly newspaper is produced in Hinton; the Hinton Voice, a weekly independent newspaper that started up in June 2009.

Radio

CBXI-FM 88.1 CBC Radio One
CFXH-FM 97.5 Newcap Broadcasting
CFHI-FM 104.9 Newcap Broadcasting

CHFA-FM-4 100.7 Première Chaîne
CKUA-FM-7 102.5 CKUA Radio Network

Notable people 

Bob Nystrom (born 1952), Swedish-Canadian professional ice hockey player
Dave Scatchard (born 1976), professional National Hockey League ice hockey player
Glenn Taylor (born 1961/62), former leader of the Alberta Party, former mayor

See also 
List of communities in Alberta
List of towns in Alberta

References

External links 

 
1956 establishments in Alberta
Towns in Alberta
Former new towns in Alberta